The Directorate (Kerensky Second Government) was the short-lived transitional government of Russia during the Russian Revolution. It consisted of five main ministers and lasted for about three weeks.

Members

History

The Directorate was founded by decree of the Russian Provisional Government on 14 September 1917. The Directorate was responsible for "public affairs until the establishment of the Cabinet." The Directorate was created to resolve the crisis stemming from the Kornilov Affair and the collapse of the Second Provisional Government as the Constitutional Democratic Party members of the government left the Cabinet.

On October 8, with the formation of the 3rd coalition, the Directorate was abolished.

During the Directorate on September 14, Russia was proclaimed a republic and the State Duma of the Russian Empire was dissolved.

During September 27 through October 5 at the Alexandrine Theater convened the All-Russian Democratic Conference which at the end formed the so-called Pre-parliament or the Provisional Council of the Russian Republic.

See also
Russian Provisional Government
French Directory, a similar institution during the French Revolution

References

1917 in Russia
Russian Revolution
Russian governments
Russian Provisional Government
Cabinets established in 1917